The 2017 Hampshire County Council election took place on 4 May 2017 as part of the 2017 local elections in the United Kingdom. All councillors were elected from electoral divisions by first-past-the-post voting for a four-year term of office. The electoral divisions were somewhat changed from the previous election, with some being split, merged or with boundary changes. No elections were held in Portsmouth and Southampton, which are unitary authorities and hold their elections in other years. Similarly the districts within Hampshire did also not hold elections this year.

Summary 
The incumbent Conservatives (majority since 1997) increased their majority from 45 to 56, over a two thirds majority, whilst the Liberal Democrats, the second largest party, won two new seats, increasing their seats to 19.The Liberal Democrats performed best around Winchester, and Eastleigh, whilst the Conservatives performed well across rural areas. Labour and UKIP meanwhile both lost seats, with Labour losing two of their four seats in Basingstoke, whilst UKIP lost all representation across the County. Community Campaign (Hart) managed to retain their only seat, Church Crookham & Ewshot, while also standing in a second county seat for the first time in Fleet Town, where they came second place after the Conservatives, who won with a majority of 508. The Green Party also increased their vote share, but failed to gain representation. The sole Independent incumbent, in Lymington, lost their seat.

Boundary changes
The Local Government Boundary Commission for England undertook a review of boundaries during the previous council's term. An Order to enact the boundary changes was made in October 2016 and took effect at this election.

By district, the changes made included:
Basingstoke and Deane: retained 10 seats. The west of the Norden ward was transferred from Basingstoke North to Basingstoke Central. Eastrop and the town centre was transferred from Basingstoke Central to Basingstoke South East. Kingsclere was transferred from Calleva & Kingsclere to Whitchurch & Clere, with the wards respectively renamed Calleva and Whitchurch & The Cleres. Candovers was renamed Candovers, Oakley and Overton.
East Hampshire retained 7 seats. Headley was renamed Liphook, Headley & Grayshott.
Eastleigh was increased from 7 to 8 seats. The divisions of Hedge End & Botley and West End & Hedge End Grange Park were abolished and replaced with three divisions: Botley & Hedge End North, Hedge End & West End South and West End & Horton Heath. The latter also took away territory from Bishopstoke & Fair Oak, which was shifted westwards. The East and West divisions of Eastleigh were replaced by divisions named North and South.
Fareham retained 7 seats. The 6 divisions had the same names as before, with Fareham Town continuing to elect 2 councillors.
Gosport retained 5 seats. The 5 divisions had the same names as before, with Leesland & Town continuing to elect 2 councillors.
Hart retained 5 seats. The Odiham and Hartley Wintney & Yateley West divisions were replaced with divisions with similar boundaries named Odiham & Hook and Hartley Wintney, Eversley & Yateley West. The Fleet division was reduced in size and renamed Fleet Town. It also gained some territory from Yateley East, Blackwater & Ancells, which was renamed Yateley East & Blackwater.
Havant retained 7 seats. The 2-member division of Bedhampton & Leigh Park was split and replaced by North West Havant and North East Havant, with the latter taking territory from Emsworth & St Faiths.
New Forest was reduced from 11 to 10 seats. The division of Lyndhurst was abolished. The town of Lyndhurst itself was added to the same division of Fordingbridge, and named Lyndhurst & Fordingbridge. Totton North added some rural areas and was renamed Totton North & Netley Marsh. An expanded Lymington division was renamed Lymington & Boldre. Milford & Hordle gained some territory from New Milton and was renamed New Milton North, Milford & Hordle.
Rushmoor retained 5 seats. The East and West divisions of Aldershot were replaced with North and South divisions.
Test Valley retained 7 seats. Romsey Extra was renamed Romsey Rural.
Winchester retained 7 seats. The divisions retained their names, though the boundary between Bishop's Waltham and Meon Valley was altered substantially.

Results

|}

Results by electoral division
Hampshire County Council is divided into 11 districts, which are split further into electoral divisions. 
Asterisks denote incumbent Councillors seeking re-election. Councillors seeking re-election were elected in 2013, and results are compared to that year's polls on that basis.

Basingstoke and Deane (10 seats)

No UKIP candidate as previous (-26).

Stephen Reid was the incumbent councillor for a neighboring ward, Basingstoke North West.

No Liberal Democrat candidate as previous (-9).

No Independent candidate as previous (-9).

No UKIP candidate as previous (-25).

No UKIP candidate as previous (-23).

East Hampshire (7 seats)

No UKIP candidate as previous (-24).

No UKIP candidate as previous (-24).

No UKIP candidate as previous (-24).

Adam Carew was originally elected to Hampshire County Council in 2005 as a Liberal Democrat. Two months after the previous election, in July 2013, he defected to the Conservatives.

No UKIP candidate as previous (-30).

Eastleigh (8 seats) 

Changes compared with the old Botley & Hedge End ward. 

No Green candidate as previous (-3).

No Christian candidate as previous (-1). Changes compared with the old Eastleigh East ward, which is largely similar to this ward in all but name.  

No Green candidate (-2), No Monster Raving Loony candidate (-1) and No TUSC candidate (-0) as previous. Changes compared with the old Eastleigh West ward, which is largely similar to this ward in all but name.  

No comparisons available for this ward as no direct predecessor ward exists. The ward is made up of a large part of the old Botley and Hedge End ward while also encompassing small parts of the old Hamble ward and the old West End and Hedge End Grange Park ward. 

Martin Lyon was the incumbent UKIP councillor for Bishopstoke and Fair Oak. Changes compared with the old West End and Hedge End Grange Park ward.

Fareham (7 seats)

No Green candidate as previous (-8).

No Independent candidate (-29) as previous. 

No UKIP candidates (-29) as previous.

Gosport (5 seats)

No BNP candidate as previous (-1). 

No UKIP candidate as previous (-15). 

No BNP candidate as previous (-3).

Hart (5 seats)

Havant (7 seats)

New Forest (10 seats)

Rushmoor (5 seats)

Test Valley (7 seats)

Winchester (7 seats)

References

2017
2017 English local elections
2010s in Hampshire